James Edward "Icicle" Reeder (1858 – January 15, 1913) was an American Major League Baseball player. He played in the outfield for all six.

Reeder died in 1913 in his home town of Cincinnati, Ohio, of general paralysis of the insane.

References

External links
, or Retrosheet

Major League Baseball outfielders
Cincinnati Red Stockings (AA) players
Washington Nationals (UA) players
Nashville Blues players
Lincoln Tree Planters players
Toledo Maumees (minor league) players
Austin Senators players
Baseball players from Cincinnati
1858 births
1913 deaths
19th-century baseball players